The 1928 Southern Conference men's basketball tournament took place from February 24–February 28, 1928, at Municipal Auditorium in Atlanta, Georgia. The Mississippi Rebels won their first Southern Conference title, led by head coach Homer Hazel.

Bracket

* Overtime game

Championship

All-Southern tournament team

See also
List of Southern Conference men's basketball champions

References

Tournament
Southern Conference men's basketball tournament
Southern Conference men's basketball tournament
Southern Conference men's basketball tournament